The ITU-T Study Group 17 (SG17) is a statutory group of the ITU Telecommunication Standardization Sector (ITU-T) concerned with security. The group is concerned with a broad range of security-related standardization issues such as cybersecurity, security management, security architectures and frameworks, countering spam, identity management, biometrics, protection of personally identifiable information, and the security of applications and services for the Internet of Things (IoT). It is responsible for standardization of i.a. ASN.1 and X.509, it is also the parent body of the Focus Group on Quantum Information Technology (FG-QIT). The group is currently chaired by Heung Youl Youm of South Korea.

Administratively, SG17  is a statutory meeting of the World Telecommunication Standardization Assembly (WTSA), which creates the ITU-T Study Groups and appoints their management teams. The secretariat is provided by the Telecommunication Standardization Bureau (under Director Chaesub Lee).

Standards 

 ASN.1
 X.500
 X.509
 X.800
 X.1035
 X.1205
 RM-ODP
 OSI model

Trustworthy AI 
Together with ITU-T Study Group 16 and AI for Good, the study group has been developing technology specifications under Trustworthy AI. Including items on homomorphic encryption, secure multi-party computation, and federated learning.

See also
International Telecommunication Union
ITU Telecommunication Standardization Sector
ASN.1
X.509

References

External links 
 ITU main site
 ITU-T Study Group 17 web site

International Telecommunication Union